Verkh-Anuyskoye is a rural locality (a selo) and the administrative center of Verkh-Anuysky Selsoviet, Bystroistoksky District, Altai Krai, Russia. The population was 1,148 as of 2013. There are 19 streets.

Geography 
Verkh-Anuyskoye is located 31 km SSE of Bystry Istok (the district's administrative centre) by road, on the Anuy River. Khleborobnoye is the nearest rural locality.

References 

Rural localities in Bystroistoksky District